Alsop High School is a coeducational secondary school and sixth form located in Walton, Liverpool, L4 6SH, England. The school is well known for its white and brown remaining one of the hallmarks of Walton village.

History 

The school was founded by the Liverpool Education Committee in 1919, under the chairmanship of James W. Alsop. The school moved to its current premises on Queen's Drive in 1926.

After World War II, further buildings were constructed - a dining annex, an assembly hall, a library and an art room, which was completed around 1953-4. Previously the Hall had been on the ground floor behind the front tower with windows onto the yard. When the new hall was opened, this area was converted into three classrooms onto the yard, and laboratories to the front onto Queens Drive.

Further additions later included a new block with laboratories, a gym, and a metalwork shop. In recent years, the school also acquired the old Arnot Street school on County Road and adjacent to Arnot Street primary school. The lower school was designed by Gilling Dod, based in the Cunard Building, Liverpool. The lower school was demolished and the site has since been used to develop a Tesco Metro store and a car park.

Previously a community school administered by Liverpool City Council, in November 2020 Alsop High School converted to academy status. The school is now sponsored by the Omega Multi-Academy Trust.

Campus 
Alsop High School is the largest secondary school in Liverpool at present. The current Alsop High School building was built in 1926, and an extensive refurbishment / backlog maintenance of the existing campus buildings began in September 2008. The campus recently benefited from the construction of a new £8.4m building designed by architects 2020 Liverpool and includes a new canteen, new 6th form facilities, reception area, atrium, new Spanish, Humanities, and English learning pods as well as classrooms with improved IT facilities and a new dance and activity studio. The site has also benefited from extensive new landscaping and refurbishment of the listed rectory building. Aside from the Jamieson (named after a former headmaster) and 1926 buildings, there are also the MAD (Music, Art and Drama) block and the ICT block, which consists of the school's LRC (Learning Resource Center).

Curriculum
The Alsop High School was awarded with Applied Learning status in 2006, allowing the school to offer a range of vocational subjects.

In some subjects at Key Stage 3, students are taught in mixed ability classes, whilst in other subjects students are placed in teaching groups according to motivation, attainment and ability.

All students at Key Stage 3 study English, mathematics, science, humanities, Spanish, PE, music, drama, art and design as well as PSHCE, picking up the additional subjects of IT and Technology in Years 8 and 9.

Extracurricular activities

The PE department runs activities that include athletics, badminton, basketball, boxing, cricket, fitness, football, hockey, netball, rounders, rugby, swimming, table tennis, and trampolining.

Other activities include art, dance, drama, Duke of Edinburgh's Award, guitar, keyboard, maths revision club, study club and Young Enterprise.

In 2011, the Alsop Community Magazine was founded. Since then, it has published three editions of the free magazine which contains news about the school. It is distributed around the local primary schools and community by the contributors to the magazine, who are all Alsop pupils. You can view the articles on the school web page.

In July 2012, Alsop High School was used to film part of episode 3 of Utopia, where a fictional school shooting is filmed. This scene received 37 complaints to UK media regulator Ofcom, proving especially controversial as the scene aired only a month after the Sandy Hook Elementary School shootings in Connecticut, USA. This caused Channel 4 to consider whether to carry on airing Utopia, yet carried on after much deliberation.

Notable former pupils
Sir Arnold Hall, chairman of Hawker Siddeley (1967-1986)
Peter Reading, poet
Alexei Sayle, comedian
Bob Wareing, former MP for Liverpool West Derby
Jimmy Mulville, producer, actor, writer and co-founder of Hat Trick Productions
Ian McCulloch, lead singer for Echo & the Bunnymen
Mike Carey, writer

Notable former staff
 Philip Alexander Jamieson, formerly head teacher, was awarded an OBE in 2012.
 Gerard Houllier, teaching assistant 1969-70, former Liverpool, Aston Villa, and PSG manager

References

External links 
 Alsop High School

Secondary schools in Liverpool
Academies in Liverpool
Specialist applied learning colleges in England